I'm Your Baby Tonight is the third studio album by American singer Whitney Houston released on November 6, 1990, by Arista Records. The album has been certified quadruple platinum in the US by the RIAA.

Background
By 1989, Whitney Houston had become one of the most successful musicians in the industry, with her last two albums - Whitney Houston (1985) and Whitney (1987) - having sold a combined 30 million copies at the time. Houston's crossover blend of pop and R&B had helped her to break barriers on pop radio and on MTV, which along with the commercial breakthrough of Michael Jackson, led to the music industry enjoying "the best time for crossover artists since the height of disco in the mid-to-late '70s", according to journalist Frank Rizzo in 1987. Despite this, however, some black critics began to voice their disapproval of Houston's music, especially with her sophomore release, Whitney, which included the number-one hits, the dance pop hit "I Wanna Dance with Somebody (Who Loves Me)" and, in particular, the rock song, "So Emotional", accusing the singer of "selling out". They also felt that her records lacked the soul of her live performances of the same songs. While attending the 1989 Soul Train Music Awards, Houston's name was jeered by some in the audience after she was announced as a nominee in a category. Houston defended herself against the criticism telling Essence magazine in 1990, "If you're gonna have a long career, there's a certain way to do it and I did it that way. I'm not ashamed of it."

Still, both Houston and her label head Clive Davis agreed to go into a more urban direction as popular music was starting to embrace a new urban pop sound called new jack swing. As the material on her previous albums had been picked by the label, Houston wanted more creative control over the album's content. As a result, Houston would serve as an executive producer for the first time on an album. She recruited the new jack swing production team of L.A. Reid and Babyface, citing their work on Bobby Brown's Don't Be Cruel, to help her with her new direction. The duo would present the songs "I'm Your Baby Tonight", "My Name Is Not Susan", their sole ballad "Miracle" and "Anymore". Houston also recruited longtime idol Stevie Wonder on the album with the two collaborating on the Wonder-composed duet, "We Didn't Know", while longtime friend, singer Luther Vandross, penned the dance-pop song "Who Do You Love". 

Houston would also produce a song herself, "I'm Knockin'", which was written for her by longtime musical collaborator and the musical director of her concert tours, Rickey Minor and BeBe Winans. Houston would co-produce and co-write another song with Winans titled "Takin' a Chance". Houston and Davis kept previous producers Michael Masser and Narada Michael Walden. With Masser, Houston was received the soft rock song, "After We Make Love", which would end up being their last collaboration together, while with Walden, Houston recorded the songs "I Belong to You", "Lover for Life", and the Linda Clifford ballad "All the Man That I Need", the sole cover of the album. Houston and Walden also worked on songs such as "Higher Love", "Dancing on the Smooth Edge" and "Feels So Good". At the end, "Takin' a Chance" and the three latter Walden productions were left off the album's final track list, except in Japan where "Higher Love" and "Takin' a Chance" were featured.

Music
I'm Your Baby Tonights Walden-produced songs are divided by contemporary dance-pop tracks and ornate ballads, while Reid and Babyface's productions reappropriate 1970s black pop and danceable funk with aggressive 1980s dance rhythms. According to AllMusic's Ashley S. Battel, Houston "attempts to make a larger foray into dance music" with this album, while David Browne observed light synthesizer flourishes, thumping drum beats, and "dance-fever settings" throughout. James Hunter of Rolling Stone described the album as "a case study in how much [Houston] can get out of her luscious and straightforward vocal gifts within a dancepop framework." J. D. Considine wrote that Houston's singing on the album features "sultry moans, note-bending asides, [and] window-rattling gospel shouts". Rolling Stone magazine's Jim Macnie said that the album "displayed a slick R&B edge" and features "funk-and-dance-driven pop".

Commercial performance
In the United States, I'm Your Baby Tonight debuted at number 22 on the Billboard 200 chart, for the issue dated November 24, 1990. In its second week, it leapt to number five;  the following week saw its peak position,  at number three. The album spent 22 weeks in the top ten, and was on the chart for a total of 51 weeks. It also debuted at number 10 on the Billboard Top R&B Albums chart, the issue date of December 1, 1990, and reached the number one position of that chart three weeks later. The record was at the top of the R&B/Hip-Hop chart for eight non-consecutive weeks, and was present on that chart for a total of 53 weeks. Due to its great performance on the chart, it became the #1 R&B album on the Billboard year-end charts for 1991. The album was certified 4× platinum by the Recording Industry Association of America on April 5, 1995, and since Nielsen SoundScan began tracking sales data in May 1991, it had sold (as of 2009) 1,728,000 copies in the United States; this numerical amount does not include copies sold in the initial months of the album's release or its sales through mail-order sources such as Columbia House or BMG Music Club. This is not its sales total, as the biggest portion of the sales occurred in November of 1990, before there was Nielsen SoundScan.

The album was a hit internationally (though its sales didn't reach a level as high as the previous two albums), boosting Houston to global super-stardom. In Britain, it entered the UK Albums Chart at number 6 on November 17, 1990, and peaked at number 4, nine weeks later. The British Phonographic Industry certified the album Platinum, for shipments of 300,000 units, on November 1, 1990. In Germany, the album peaked at number three on the Media Control Albums Chart, receiving Platinum certification (for shipments of 500,000 copies), by the Bundesverband Musikindustrie, in 1991. It also reached the top five in other countries, such as Austria, Norway, Sweden, and Switzerland. To date, the album has sold approximately 10 million copies, worldwide.

Singles
I'm Your Baby Tonight yielded four top-twenty singles on the Hot 100 Singles chart, and six top-twenty singles on the Hot R&B Singles chart between 1990 and 1992. "I'm Your Baby Tonight" and "All the Man That I Need" both reached number 1. This success earned Houston a ranking of number 3 Pop singles artist and number 1 R&B singles artist on the 1991 Billboard year-end charts.

The title track, "I'm Your Baby Tonight", was released as the first single from the album in October 1990. While the L.A. Reid/Babyface mix version was released in the United States, an alternate Yvonne Turner mix, labeled the international version or European version, was released in other countries. The single debuted at number forty-two on the Billboard Hot 100 singles chart in the week ending October 20, 1990. Six weeks later, in the issue dated December 1, 1990, it reached number one and stayed there for a week, becoming Houston's eighth number-one single on the chart. It also peaked at number one in the same week on the Hot R&B Singles chart and remained on the top for two weeks, making it her fourth R&B chart topper. In addition, the song peaked at number seven on the Hot Adult Contemporary chart, spending a total of twenty-eight weeks on the chart. The single was certified Gold for shipments of 500,000 copies by the Recording Industry Association of America (RIAA) on November 27, 1990. Worldwide it was a big hit during her European promotion in November–December 1990. In Italy, it reached number one on the Musica e dischi singles chart in November 1990 and remained atop for five weeks, becoming her second number-one song on the chart, after 1987's "I Wanna Dance with Somebody (Who Loves Me)". In the United Kingdom, the single entered the UK Singles Chart at number sixteen on October 20, 1990, and peaked at number five two weeks later, becoming her eighth top ten hit. It also reached the top five in many countries such as Austria, Belgium, France, Germany, the Netherlands, Norway, Sweden, and Switzerland. It also went top ten in Australia and Ireland. Houston was nominated for Best Pop Vocal Performance, Female with this track at the 33rd Grammy Awards of 1991.

Houston's remake of a ballad, "All the Man That I Need" was the album's second single, released in December 1990. The single achieved great success on the Billboard charts. It debuted at number fifty-three on the Hot 100 on December 22, 1990, and topped the chart nine weeks later, in the issue dated February 23, 1991. On March 2, 1991, when it reached the number one on the Hot R&B Singles chart, the single enjoyed its second and third week at the top of the Hot 100 and Hot Adult Contemporary chart, respectively. As a result, it became her first single to top the Hot 100, Hot R&B, and Hot Adult Contemporary chart simultaneously—which "I Will Always Love You" also achieved for five weeks in 1992/93—and overall her third triple-crown hit, after 1985's "Saving All My Love for You" and 1986's "How Will I Know" both reached the top spot on those three charts in different weeks. The RIAA certified it Gold on March 21, 1991. Unlike the United States, it was a modest hit globally. It peaked at number one on the Canadian RPM Top 100 Singles chart for one week and number ten on Belgian VRT Top 30 chart. However, it only reached the top twenty in Ireland, the Netherlands and the United Kingdom. With this song, Houston received a nomination for Best Pop Vocal Performance, Female at the 34th Grammy Awards in 1992, which was her fifth nomination in that category.

After the release of "The Star Spangled Banner" single, "Miracle" was released as the third single from the album in April 1991. It peaked at number nine on the Billboard Hot 100 on June 8, 1991, becoming her thirteenth top ten hit on the chart. It also reached number two and number four, on the Hot R&B Singles and Adult Contemporary chart, respectively.

The album's fourth single "My Name Is Not Susan" was released in July 1991. In September, the song peaked at number twenty on the Hot 100 and number eight on the Hot R&B, becoming her fifteenth R&B top ten hit.

A fifth single, "I Belong to You", became a top ten R&B single and garnered Houston a Grammy nomination for Best Female R&B Vocal Performance at the 35th Grammy Awards.

"We Didn't Know", a duet with Stevie Wonder, was the sixth and final single from the album, released exclusively for R&B airplay in April 1992. It peaked at number twenty on the Hot R&B Singles chart in the issue dated July 4, 1992. Included on the tracklisting of the album's Japanese edition is a cover of Steve Winwood's "Higher Love", which was resurrected by Norwegian DJ Kygo in 2019, and "Takin' a Chance"; the latter became a success in the country.

Promotion and appearances

Tour

{| class="wikitable"
|-
!  style="text-align:center; width:140px;"|Date
!  style="text-align:center; width:260px;"|Title
!  style="text-align:center; width:800px;"|Details
|-
| style="text-align:center;"|December 4, 1990
|The Arsenio Hall Show
|
 Houston performed "All the Man That I Need" and "We Didn't Know with Stevie Wonder, followed by both Houston and Wonder interview with Arsenio Hall on recording their first duet song.
|-
| style="text-align:center;"|December 11, 1990
|The Tonight Show Starring Johnny Carson(Guest Host: Jay Leno)
|
 Houston performed "All the Man That I Need" and interviewed by Jay Leno, followed by another performance of "Do You Hear What I Hear?".
|-
| style="text-align:center;"|January 4, 1991
|The Arsenio Hall Show
|
 Houston performed "I'm Your Baby Tonight" followed by an interview with Arsenio Hall.
|-
| style="text-align:center;"|February 23, 1991
|Saturday Night Live
|
 Musical guest; performance: "I'm Your Baby Tonight" and "All the Man That I Need".
|-
| style="text-align:center;"|March 31, 1991
|Welcome Home Heroes with Whitney Houston
|
Houston performed for members of the US armed forces returning from the Persian Gulf War.
This exclusive one-time-only event was her first-ever solo televised live concert on HBO.
Set-list was almost the same as the I'm Your Baby Tonight World Tours.
|-
| style="text-align:center;"|May 12, 1991
|The Simple Truth: A Concert for Kurdish Refugees
|
This five-hour telethon broadcast in 36 countries which raised $15 million. The main concert was staged at Wembley Arena, with five satellite sites beaming concerts from around the world.
Houston allowed MTV to simulcast her performances of "My Name Is Not Susan", "Miracle" and "Greatest Love of All" at her Oakland, California concert during a telethon held to aid the Kurds.
|-
| style="text-align:center;"|June 23, 1991
|Coca Cola Pop Music Backstage Pass to Summer
|
A Fox's TV special hosted by Cher, which previewed the Summer 1991 music scene.
It was aired to Houston's "I'm Your Baby Tonight" live performance at Greensboro Coliseum on June 16, during I'm Your Baby Tonight World Tour.
|-
| style="text-align:center;"|January 27, 1992
|The 19th American Music Awards
|
Houston performed a medley of "I'm Your Baby Tonight", "My Name Is Not Susan" and "Who Do You Love" introduced by MC Hammer.
|-
| style="text-align:center;"|February 16, 1992
|Muhammad Ali's 50th Birthday Celebration
|
This event was taped at the Wiltern Theater in Los Angeles on February 16, 1992, aired on ABC on March 1, 1992.
She dedicated "Greatest Love of All" to Muhammad Ali, which was the theme of 1977 film The Greatest about the life of him and later joined "You've Got a Friend" with Diana Ross & other celebrities at the end of the show.
|-
| style="text-align:center;"|May 6, 1992
|Whitney Houston: This Is My Life
|
It was her first hourlong TV special aired on ABC on May 6, 1992.
This special included eight edited live performances in A Coruña, Spain during the I'm Your Baby Tonight World Tour on September 29, 1991, as well as her two live performances during rehearsals for that tour, "This Day" and "Greatest Love of All".
She talked about her musical and personal life with behind-the-scenes views of the world tour. Her co-star Kevin Costner in the movie The Bodyguard, and her parents Cissy Houston and John Houston appeared to talk about Houston.
|}

Track listingNotes'''
 All non-North American countries have the "Yvonne Turner Mix" of "I'm Your Baby Tonight" replacing the L.A. Reid/Babyface original version as track 1.

Personnel

Whitney Houston – vocals, background vocals, vocal arrangements
Walter Afanasieff – keyboards, Moog bass, synthesizers
Tawatha Agee – background vocals
Gerald Albright – saxophone
Skip Anderson – drums, keyboards
Babyface – keyboards, Memorymoog bass, vocals, background vocals
Kitty Beethoven – background vocals
Louis Biancaniello – synthesizer, keyboards
Gary Bias – alto saxophone
Vernon "Ice" Black – guitar
Kimberly Brewer – background vocals
 Ray Brown – trumpet
Chris Camozzi – guitar
Francisco Centeno – bass
Paulinho Da Costa – percussion
Hubert Eaves III – synthesizer, drums, keyboards
Steve Ferrone – drums
Lynn Fiddmont – background vocals
Kenny G – saxophone
Jerry Hey – strings
Dorian Holley – background vocals
Cissy Houston – background vocals
Paul Jackson Jr. – guitar
Skyler Jett – background vocals
Keith John – background vocals
Melisa Kary – background vocals
Kayo – Fender bass, Moog bass
Randy Kerber – strings, keyboards
Ren Klyce – Fairlight synthesizer

Robbie Kondor – strings, keyboards, rhythm
Neil Larsen – Hammond organ
Ricky Lawson – synthesizer, percussion, drums
Wayne Linsey – piano
Frank Martin – piano, keyboards, vibraphone
Paulette McWilliams – background vocals
Jason Miles – synthesizer
Ricky Minor – synthesizer, bass, horn, background vocals, rhythm, synthesized bass
Billy Myers – horn
Rafael Padilla – percussion
Donald Parks – Fairlight synthesizer
L.A. Reid – percussion, drums
Claytoven Richardson – background vocals
Tom Scott – saxophone
Michael "Patches" Stewart – trumpet
Annie Stocking – background vocals
Steve Tavaglione – horn, tenor saxophone
Jeanie Tracy – background vocals
Luther Vandross – vocals
Narada Michael Walden – synthesized bass, percussion
David Ward II – synthesizer
Bill Washer – guitar
Kirk Whalum – saxophone, tenor saxophone
Brenda White-King – background vocals
BeBe Winans – background vocals
CeCe Winans – background vocals
Stevie Wonder – vocals, multiple instruments, performer
Reggie C. Young – trombone

Production

L.A. Reid - producer (tracks: "I'm Your Baby Tonight", "My Name Is Not Susan", "Anymore" and "Miracle"), arranger
Babyface  - producer (tracks: "I'm Your Baby Tonight", "My Name Is Not Susan", "Anymore" and "Miracle"), arranger
Jon Gass - recording
Barney Perkins - recording
Donnell Sullivan - engineer
Ryan Dorn - engineer
Jim Zumpano - engineer
Cynthia Ahiloh - production coordination
Marsha Burns - production coordination
Susanne Edgren - production coordination
Janice Lee - production coordination
Cynthia Shiloh - production coordination
Kevin Walden - production coordination
Gar Wood - production coordination
Stephanie Andrews - project coordinator
Robert A. Arbittier - sound design
Louis Biancaniello - drum programming, additional programming
Walter Afanasieff - drum programming
Ren Klyce - programming
Ricky Lawson - programming
Jason Miles - programming
David Ward II - programming
Hubert Eaves III - drum programming
Skip Anderson - keyboard programming
Donald Parks - keyboard programming
John Anderson - arranger
Hubert Eaves III - keyboard programming, arranger
Whitney Houston - arranger, vocal arrangement
Randy Kerber - arranger
Robbie Kondor - arranger
Ricky Minor - arranger, horn arrangements
Billy Myers - arranger, horn arrangements
Steve Tavaglione - arranger, horn arrangements
Luther Vandross - arranger
Narada Michael Walden - arranger
BeBe Winans - arranger
CeCe Winans - arranger
Stevie Wonder - arranger
Jerry Hey - string arrangements
Susan Mendola - art direction
Andrea Blanch - photography
Tim White - photography
Bernard Maisner - lettering
Kevyn Aucoin - make-u
Patrick Poussard - make-up
Barbara Dente - stylist
Ellen La Var - hair stylist
George Marino - mastering

 Charts 

 Weekly charts 

 Year-end charts 

Certifications and sales

Accolades
American Black Achievement Awards
The Music Award is for the most creative and enduring contribution by a performer in live appearances or as a recording artist. Houston was presented this award for her achievements as an award-winning recording, performing and video artist, for her successful I'm Your Baby Tonight World Tour, for her best-selling video and single of "The Star-Spangled Banner" performed at Super Bowl XXV and for her multi-platinum album, I'm Your Baby Tonight.

|-
|  style="width:35px; text-align:center;"|1991 || Whitney Houston (herself) || The Music Award || 
|-

American Music Awards

|-
|  style="width:35px; text-align:center;" rowspan="5"|1992 || rowspan="2"|Whitney Houston (herself) || Favorite Pop/Rock Female Artist || 
|-
|Favorite Soul/R&B Female Artist || 
|-
| I'm Your Baby Tonight || Favorite Soul/R&B Album || 
|-
| Whitney Houston (herself) || Favorite Adult Contemporary Artist || 
|-
| I'm Your Baby Tonight || Favorite Adult Contemporary Album || 
|-

Billboard Music Awards

|-
|  style="width:35px; text-align:center;" rowspan="8"|1991 || rowspan="4"|Whitney Houston (herself) || |Top Pop Album Artists - Female || 
|-
| Top Pop Singles Artist || 
|-
| Top Pop Singles Artist - Female || 
|-
| Top R&B Artist #1 || 
|-
| I'm Your Baby Tonight || Top R&B Album #1 || 
|-
| rowspan="2"|Whitney Houston (herself) || Top R&B Album Artist #1 || 
|-
|Top R&B Singles Artist #1 || 
|-
| "All the Man That I Need" || Top Adult Contemporary Single || 
|-

BRIT Awards

|-
|  style="width:35px; text-align:center;"|1991 || Whitney Houston (herself) || Best International Female Artist || 
|-

Grammy Awards

|-
|  style="width:35px; text-align:center;"|1991 || "I'm Your Baby Tonight" || Best Pop Vocal Performance, Female || 
|-
|  style="width:35px; text-align:center;"|1992 || "All the Man That I Need" || Best Pop Vocal Performance, Female || 
|-
|  style="width:35px; text-align:center;"|1993 || "I Belong to You" || Best R&B Vocal Performance, Female || 
|-

NAACP Image Awards

|-
|  style="width:35px; text-align:center;" rowspan="2"|1992 || HBO Presents Welcome Home Heroes with Whitney Houston || Outstanding Variety Series or Special || 
|-
| "I'm Your Baby Tonight" || Outstanding Female Artist || 
|-

The CableACE Awards

|-
|  style="width:35px; text-align:center;" rowspan="2"|1992 || rowspan="2"|HBO Presents Welcome Home Heroes with Whitney Houston || Performance in a Music Special or Series || 
|-
|Music Special || 
|-

Recording Industry Association of America (RIAA) Awards

Soul Train Music Awards

|-
|  style="width:35px; text-align:center;" rowspan="2"|1992 || I'm Your Baby Tonight || Best R&B/Soul Album, Female || 
|-
| "All the Man That I Need" || Best R&B/Soul Single, Female || 
|-

Billboard Magazine Year-End Charts
Categories which Houston was ranked #1, were excluded. See above awards list for her #1-ranked-categories.

References

External links
I'm Your Baby Tonight at AllMusic
I'm Your Baby Tonight at Discogs
I'm Your Baby Tonight at Whitney Houston's Official Website

Whitney Houston albums
1990 albums
Albums produced by Narada Michael Walden
Albums produced by Michael Masser
Albums produced by Luther Vandross
Albums produced by L.A. Reid
Albums produced by Babyface (musician)
Albums produced by Stevie Wonder
Albums produced by Clive Davis
Albums produced by Whitney Houston
Arista Records albums
Funk albums by American artists
Pop albums by American artists
New jack swing albums